München Olympiastadion is a former stop on the Munich S-Bahn. The station was built in the early 1970s and opened on 26 May 1972 to provide additional means of transportation for the 1972 Summer Olympics. 
The station was used during the 1972 Olympics, but afterward was disconnected from the regular service network. It was used sporadically during football matches in the nearby Olympic Stadium. Since 8 August 1984, S8 and S11 services called at the station when football matches were taking place at the stadium. The station was officially closed in 1988 and the tracks leading to the station were removed in 2003.

The station consisted of two island platforms with four tracks in total. Two of them terminated at the station, and the remaining two continued further south. Access was provided by the so-called Northern Ring, a normally freight-only railway line. During the Olympics, trains arrived from the west from Allach and Moosach as well as from Johanneskirchen in the east. Later, the station was used in one way operation, with trains arriving from the western route and departing to the east.

The station was officially closed on 8 July 1988 after the last game of the 1988 UEFA European Football Championship, and has fallen into disrepair. The tracks were disconnected in 2003 to permit easier excavation of the tunnel for the U3 extension of the Munich U-Bahn. The Transrapid line connecting Munich's central station and the airport was planned to use the former S-Bahn and freight train right-of-way leading to this station. It would have emerged from the tunnel approximately 500 meters south of the station, near the Borstei. However, the line was abandoned due to increased costs.

Railway stations in Germany opened in 1972
Railway stations closed in 1988
1988 disestablishments in West Germany
Olympiastadion
Abandoned rapid transit stations
Olympiastadion